Lim Soo Nee is a Malaysian politician. He was the Kedah State Legislative Assemblyman for Kulim from 2008 until 2013. In 2009, he was appointed as an EXCO member to replace the Lunas assemblyman, Mohd Radzhi Salleh who had left the PKR.

Election results

References 

People's Justice Party (Malaysia) politicians
Year of birth missing (living people)
Living people